David Watson (7 January 1854 – 3 March 1906) was a Scotland international rugby union player. He played at the Forward position.

Rugby Union career

Amateur career

Watson played for Glasgow Academicals.

Provincial career

Watson captained Glasgow District in the Inter-City match against Edinburgh District in 1876.

Watson also represented the West of Scotland District.

International career

Watson was capped by Scotland for just three matches. His debut was the 1876 match against England at The Oval on 6 March 1876; his final match was also against England the following year at Raeburn Place. The other match was against Ireland in Belfast in 1877.

Referee career

Watson became a referee after his playing career ended.

Administrative career

Watson was President of the SRU from 1880-81.

References

1854 births
1906 deaths
Scottish rugby union players
Glasgow Academicals rugby union players
Scotland international rugby union players
Glasgow District (rugby union) players
West of Scotland District (rugby union) players
Presidents of the Scottish Rugby Union
Blues Trial players
Rugby union players from Glasgow
Rugby union forwards